Springton Reservoir (also known as Springton Lake or Geist Reservoir) is a reservoir in Delaware County in the U.S. state of Pennsylvania. Created in 1931 when Crum Creek was dammed near Pennsylvania Route 252, it is an approximately  drinking-water reservoir maintained by Essential Utilities. The reservoir is within Newtown Township, Marple Township, and Upper Providence Township.

Until the last two decades, the reservoir was open to fishing via an entrance on Gradyville Road in Newtown Township. There is still a wide array of aquatic life in the reservoir, which includes largemouth and smallmouth bass, crappie, various pan fish, muskie, trout, and catfish. There is also a bald eagle which has a nest on the Upper Providence side of the reservoir. The reservoir is patrolled by Aqua America security during day hours.

References

Bodies of water in Delaware County, Pennsylvania
Reservoirs in Pennsylvania